The Club Paradise Tour was the second headlining tour by Canadian recording artist Drake. The tour came following the release of Drake's second studio album, Take Care. The tour's name spins off from the 2011 song "Club Paradise", a promotional single released ahead of the release of Take Care, which, in turn, borrowed its name from a strip club in Toronto. An official poster for the tour was released along with the announcement of the venture, showing Drake in the same room as is on the album cover, expressing the despondent conflicting stance about growing wealth and fame prevalent in the album.

The tour featured Kendrick Lamar and A$AP Rocky as opening acts for the majority of the dates throughout the tour, with various acts being added as the tour expanded beyond North America. Due to the large demand and tickets selling out in minutes in multiple locations, extra tour dates were added to the itinerary, which included a second leg across the United States. The tour became a commercial success, grossing $42 million in the tour's duration. It was the highest-grossing hip-hop tour of 2012, according to Pollstar's annual year end tour chart.

Background
Drake would announce the tour in October 2011, releasing dates in December, announcing that the "Club Paradise Tour" was set to feature in over college amphitheaters and multi-purpose arenas across the United States and Canada. This was seen as a shock move by Drake, due to the mainstream exposure and commercial success he had experienced following the releases of his two studio albums. Drake would later confirm in an interview with MTV that the labels had wanted him to embark on a stadium tour, which he rejected. He would comment, stating "I fought for this tour, I fought really hard for this tour because, of course, they want me to go get the big bucks, go into the stadiums and cash out. But I was just like, 'I really made this album for the same people that supported me since day one' [so I can't sell out]".

Opening acts
Kendrick Lamar (North America—Leg 1, Europe—Leg 1, select dates)
A$AP Rocky (North America—Leg 1, Europe—Leg 1, select dates)
J. Cole (North America—Leg 2)
Waka Flocka Flame (North America—Leg 2)
Meek Mill (North America—Leg 2)
2 Chainz (North America—Leg 2)
French Montana (North America—Leg 2)
Chief Keef (North America—Leg 2)
Illy Da King (North America—Leg 2)
Lual Allstar (North America—Leg 2)
Rita Ora (United Kingdom, selected dates)
Tinie Tempah (Europe)
Labrinth (France, United Kingdom, selected dates)

Setlist
"Lord Knows"
"Under Ground Kings"
"I'm On One"
"Over"
"Crew Love" (in some venues)
"The Zone"
"She Will"
"Shot For Me
"We'll Be Fine"
"Forever"
"Marvins Room"
"Take Care"
"Cameras"
"Uptown"
"Miss Me
Medley: "Look What You've Done" / "Fancy" / "Make Me Proud"
"Practice"
"HYFR (Hell Ya Fucking Right)"
Encore 
"The Motto"
"Headlines"

Notes
Drake performed "Crew Love" in lieu of "The Zone" at the show in Los Angeles, California, as well as performing "I'm Goin' In", "Up All Night", "Round of Applause",  "Ima Boss" and "Can't Get Enough".
Waka Flocka Flame would bring out Wale at the show in Cincinnati, Ohio, to perform "No Hands".
Drake would bring out Rick Ross at the show in Houston, Texas, to perform Ima Boss and Stay Schemin' with Meek Mill.

Tour dates

Box office score data

References

2012 concert tours
Drake (musician) concert tours
Events in Arlington, Texas